Carterica buquetii is a species of beetle in the family Cerambycidae. It was described by Thomson in 1860. It is known from Brazil.

References

Colobotheini
Beetles described in 1860